is a tarento who mainly works in Hokkaido, film director and broadcast writer. He is the chairman of Board of Directors of Creative Office Cue Co., Ltd., and the Board of Cure Products Co., Ltd., and Manhole Film Limited. He is nicknamed . His ex-wife is Creative Office Cue President Ayumi Ito.

Directorial works

Films

TV dramas

Stage

Filmography

TV programmes
 Hokkaido Television Broadcasting

 Sapporo Television Broadcasting

 Hokkaido Cultural Broadcasting

 Hokkaido Broadcasting

 NHK Sapporo Broadcasting Station

 TV Tokyo

 Fuji Television

 BS Fuji

 Channel Neco

 Tokyo MX

Radio programmes
 Air-G'

 Date FM

Films

Stage

Discography

Bibliography

See also
Hokkaido Television Broadcasting (TV Asahi affiliate in Hokkaido. Many programmes are planning and appearing)

Creative Office Cue affiliated tarentos
TEAM NACS
Hiroyuki Morisaki
Ken Yasuda
Shigeyuki Totsugi
Yo Oizumi
Takuma Oto'o
Mashiro Ayano

Other people involved
Daigo (musician) (He directed his first music video in "Daisy")

References

External links 

 
2009 interview – Wayback Machine 

Japanese film directors
Japanese businesspeople
Japanese screenwriters
Japanese television writers
Japanese male actors
Japanese radio personalities
People from Hokkaido
Japanese people in rail transport
1962 births
Living people
Male television writers